Airechtach ua Dunchadh Muirsce (???–730) was a king of Ui Fiachrach Muaidhe.

Airechtach was a grandson of Dúnchad Muirisci. However, unlike his grandfather, he never became King of Connacht.

External links
http://www.ucc.ie/celt/published/T100005A/index.html

730 deaths
Monarchs from County Mayo
8th-century Irish monarchs
Year of birth unknown